UTC−00:44 is an identifier for a time offset from UTC of −00:44.

History
UTC−00:44 was used in Liberia until January 7, 1972. It was known as Monrovia Mean Time or Liberian Time. The exact time zone was GMT −0h 43m 08s (based on the longitude of Monrovia) until it was redefined as GMT−0:44 on March 1, 1919. On 7 January 1972 it was changed to UTC+00:00.

References

UTC offsets
History of Liberia
Time in Liberia